Samsung S5600v (also known as Samsung Blade) is a mobile phone that was announced in June 2009 and released in September 2009 as part of a range of touch-screen phones being released by Samsung. The phone is an updated version of the Samsung S5600.

References

s-8000
Mobile phones introduced in 2009